Metamorphosis is the first EP by Norwegian experimental electronica band Ulver. Written and produced by Kristoffer Rygg and Tore Ylwizaker, the EP was issued on 27 September 1999 via Jester Records. The EP showcased Ulver's new electronic musical direction that would become more readily apparent on the album Perdition City.

In the sleeve notes to Metamorphosis, the group declared:

Background
Kristoffer Rygg commented “[Metamorphosis] was totally electronic, at parts even techno. When we are in the studio, things seem to go their own paths. We never write anything in advance but all is improvised in the studio. Usually we have only a pattern, a loop or a sound we like. Then we just play with that sound until it becomes a song.“

Critical reception

Upon its original release, Metamorphosis received mixed reviews.

John Chedsey, writing for Satan Stole My Teddybear, commented: “Having consistently reinvented themselves on every release, Ulver has made the final transformation into an electronic act in the vein of Future Sound of London or a more resonant and layered Aphex Twin. The EP captures their new sound fairly well. As a preview for their upcoming Perdition City, Metamorphosis is a great teaser.

Track listing

Personnel 
Ulver
 Kristoffer Rygg (credited as "Trickster G.") - electronic programming
 Tore Ylwizaker - electronic programming
 Håvard Jørgensen - electronic programming

Technical personnel
Ingar Hunskaar - mastering
Tore Ylwizaker - mixing

References

Ulver albums
1999 EPs